Hossein Khosrow Ali Vaziri (romanized: Hossein Xosrô 'Ali Vaziri; born March 15, 1942), better known by his ring name the Iron Sheik, is an Iranian retired professional wrestler, amateur wrestler and actor. He is the only Iranian champion in WWE history, having won the WWF World Heavyweight Championship in 1983. His villainous character peaked during the 1980s WWF wrestling boom and his rivalry with Hulk Hogan turned Hogan into one of the greatest television heroes of the decade. He later formed a tag team with Nikolai Volkoff, which won the WWF Tag Team Championship at the inaugural WrestleMania event. In 2005, he was inducted into the WWE Hall of Fame.

A heel throughout the 1980s, Sheik later gained popularity on Kidd Chris, The Howard Stern Show, and on the internet due to his shoot interviews, vulgar language, and his intense dislike for some of his fellow professional wrestlers, particularly Hulk Hogan.

Early life and amateur wrestling 
Khosrow was born in 1942 in Damghan, Iran, and grew up in a working-class family which had little money and no running water. Although his passport reads March 15, he celebrates his birthday on September 9. In his youth, he idolized Iranian Olympic Gold-Medalist wrestler Gholamreza Takhti, and he subsequently made a name for himself as an amateur wrestler; he also worked as a bodyguard for Shah Mohammad Reza Pahlavi and his family for several years.

Khosrow competed for a spot on Iran's Greco-Roman wrestling team for the 1968 Summer Olympics in Mexico City. He then moved to the United States and became the assistant coach of two U.S. Olympic squads in the 1970s. In 1971, he was the Amateur Athletic Union Greco-Roman wrestling champion and gold medalist at 180.5 pounds; he later became assistant coach to the USA team for the 1972 Olympic Games in Munich.

Professional wrestling career

Early career 
In 1972, Khosrow was invited to become a professional wrestler by promoter Verne Gagne. Khosrow trained at Gagne's wrestling camp under trainer Billy Robinson (in the same class as Ric Flair) and then wrestled for Gagne's American Wrestling Association. He also worked as a trainer, teaching Ricky Steamboat, Greg Gagne and Jim Brunzell. Khosrow first wrestled as a face in preliminary matches before a promoter suggested that he adopt a heel gimmick similar to that of the notorious Sheik.

Khosrow obliged and adopted what came to be his signature look: he shaved his head bald, grew a traditional "buffo" style mustache, added wrestling boots with the toe curled up (a nod to his ethnic background which, according to Khosrow, was an idea from Jimmy Snuka). He also introduced the Persian clubs, a sport in his native Iran, and challenged wrestlers to do as many swings as him. His Iranian gimmick received attention due to the events of the Iranian revolution. Taking the name The Great Hossein Arab, he won his first title, the Canadian Tag Team Championship, with partner the Texas Outlaw. He wrestled in Japan against the likes of Steve Day and Antonio Inoki in 1978.

World Wrestling Federation (1979–1980) 

In 1979 he caught the eye of the World Wrestling Federation (WWF) where he made his debut in 1979 and won the first-ever Battle Royal in Madison Square Garden, New York City. This earned him a title shot at then-champion Bob Backlund, who pinned him later that night in a 30-minute battle. He later feuded with Chief Jay Strongbow and Bruno Sammartino before leaving in 1980.

Jim Crockett Promotions (1980–1981) 
In April 1980, Vaziri began wrestling for the Charlotte, North Carolina-based Jim Crockett Promotions. He wrestled a handful of matches as "Hussein Arab" before settling on "The Iron Sheik". His villainous persona played upon topical events such as the Iran hostage crisis. He quickly began feuding with Jim Brunzell over the NWA Mid-Atlantic Heavyweight Championship, defeating him for the championship in May 1980. He successfully defended the championship in bouts with opponents including Brunzell, Sweet Ebony Diamond, and Johnny Weaver before losing to Ricky Steamboat in a falls count anywhere match in November 1980. In February 1981, Vaziri began feuding with Blackjack Mulligan. The two men faced one another in a series of bouts including cage matches and Texas street fights lasting until May 1981. In July 1981, Vaziri unsuccessfully challenged Dusty Rhodes for the NWA World Heavyweight Championship. Vaziri left Jim Crockett Promotions in August 1981.

Mid-South Wrestling (1981–1982) 
In September 1981, Vaziri joined the Louisiana-based Mid-South Wrestling promotion. He left the promotion in January 1982, making brief returns in October 1982.

Championship Wrestling from Florida (1982) 
In January 1982, Vaziri joined Championship Wrestling from Florida. He left the promotion at the end of February 1982.

Georgia Championship Wrestling (1982–1983) 

In July 1982, Vaziri returned to Georgia Championship Wrestling for the first time since 1974. In May 1983, he won a tournament for the vacant NWA National Television Championship. His reign lasted until July 1983, when he lost to Ronnie Garvin. Vaziri left the promotion the following month.

Return to the WWF (1983–1987)

WWF Champion (1983–1984) 
The Iron Sheik returned to the WWF in 1983 and challenged Bob Backlund for WWF World Heavyweight Championship again. Backlund accepted, and on the December 24 episode of All- American Wrestling, also accepted Sheik's weekly Persian club challenge. He was successful in his third attempt to swing the clubs, and the Sheik immediately attacked him from behind, injuring his neck. In the December 26 title bout at Madison Square Garden, Backlund attempted to roll Sheik into a bridge pin, but this aggravated his weakened neck. Sheik capitalized by applying his Camel Clutch chinlock finisher. Backlund didn't submit, but his concerned manager Arnold Skaaland threw in the towel and forfeited the championship.

The Iron Sheik rematched Backlund indecisively at house shows and primarily defended the title against Chief Jay Strongbow, as well as Pat Patterson and Salvatore Bellomo. On national TV, he defeated only jobbers, but wrestled Tito Santana on a live PRISM broadcast from The Spectrum in Philadelphia on January 21, 1984. This match was later included on WWE's Legends of Wrestling 3 compilation.

Two days later, at Madison Square Garden, The Iron Sheik was scheduled to rematch Backlund, who was replaced by Hulk Hogan. Five minutes in, Sheik had Hogan locked in the Camel Clutch. Hogan powered to his feet with Sheik still on his back, rammed him backward into the turnbuckles and hit his Atomic Legdrop for the pin and the championship. This moment is generally considered the beginning of "Hulkamania". He then bitterly feuded with Sgt. Slaughter, winning a few matches by disqualification, but losing the rest by pinfall or submission, including a "Boot Camp Rules" match.

Teaming with Nikolai Volkoff (1985–1987) 

As a tag team partner with Nikolai Volkoff, and under the management of "Classy" Freddie Blassie, they won the WWF (World) Tag Team Championship from The U.S. Express (Barry Windham and Mike Rotundo) at the first WrestleMania at Madison Square Garden when he knocked out Windham from behind with Blassie's cane. Part of the pair's regular entrance consisted of waving the flags of Iran and the Soviet Union, then demanding that the crowd be quiet and "show respect" while Volkoff sang a throaty version of the Soviet national anthem, a demand that usually only attracted boos from the usually pro-American crowds.Sheik then usually grabbed the mic and said, "Iran number 1, Russia number 1, USA (and Canada) (followed by a simulated spitting act)." It was all designed (very successfully) to get major heat from the crowd. He also got heat in his interviews with "Mean Gene" by concluding with the demand "Hey cameraman, zoom in," as he flexed his muscles. During his stint in the WWF, he appeared in the music video for Cyndi Lauper's "Goonies 'R' Good Enough" as a part of the Rock 'n' Wrestling Connection. The Iron Sheik character was also seen regularly on the CBS animated series Hulk Hogan's Rock 'n' Wrestling, where he was voiced by American actor Aron Kincaid.

During 1986, Fred Blassie was beginning to wind down his career and as part of the angle, eventually sold his wrestlers contracts to new WWF manager Slick before retiring. This included the Sheik and Nikolai Volkoff who would now be managed by the "Doctor of Style". The Sheik was a participant in the 20-man invitational Battle royal in the Chicago portion of WrestleMania 2 which saw 14 WWF superstars in the ring with 6 National Football League (NFL) players. The Sheik was the 13th participant eliminated, at 5:22 by Bruno Sammartino.

Arrest and departure (1987–1988) 
In May 1987, "Hacksaw" Jim Duggan (an on-screen rival) and Khosrow were pulled over by New Jersey State Police on their way to a WWF event, suspecting Duggan of DUI. After a search of the vehicle and the persons, police discovered that Duggan was under the influence of marijuana while the Sheik was high on cocaine. Small amounts of cocaine were also found in the vehicle. Duggan received a conditional release while the Sheik was placed on probation for a year. The mini-scandal that erupted after two in-ring enemies were found drinking and doing drugs together led to the end of the angle, the Sheik's release, and Duggan's temporary departure from the WWF. At the time, the Sheik and Volkoff were embroiled in a feud with the patriotic Duggan. Before the Sheik's release from the company, he and Volkoff had defeated The Killer Bees ("Jumping" Jim Brunzell and B. Brian Blair) by disqualification at WrestleMania III in front of 93,173 at the Pontiac Silverdome when Duggan had hit the Sheik from behind with his 2x4 piece of wood while he had Brunzell in the Camel Clutch.

Second return to WWF (1988) 
On February 18, 1988, The Iron Sheik returned to the WWF and defeated S. D. Jones on a house show at the Meadowlands Arena in East Rutherford, New Jersey. Sheik continued to wrestle on house shows in February and March, beating Lanny Poffo and Ken Patera, and losing to Bam Bam Bigelow. He would not appear on television until July 30, when he defeated Scott Casey in a match that aired on Prime Time Wrestling.

Sheik continued to wrestle that summer, facing Casey in rematches as well as Richard Charland and The Red Rooster. During his matches, comments were regularly made about the Iron Sheik's weight gain and diminished mobility. Iron Sheik had also cut promos to challenge then-World Champion "Macho Man" Randy Savage, but nothing came of it. Ultimately the return was short-lived.

WCCW, AWA, and WWC (1987–1989) 
In 1987, The Iron Sheik competed in Dallas' World Class Championship Wrestling (WCCW) where he feuded with Matt Borne over the WCWA Texas Heavyweight Championship. He stayed with that organization for only a few months, followed by brief stints with the AWA, where he attacked Sgt. Slaughter during a match, and Puerto Rico's World Wrestling Council (WWC). In addition to reigniting his feud with Slaughter and teaming with Colonel DeBeers, his main opponent during this time period was Tony Atlas, with whom he feuded in both WCCW and WWC.

National Wrestling Alliance / World Championship Wrestling (1989–1991) 
On February 25, 1989, the Iron Sheik made a surprise appearance at a NWA taping in Atlanta, Georgia and immediately challenged Ricky Steamboat. On April 11, he challenged Sting at a television taping to a Persian clubs swinging competition. On the April 29 episode the competition ensued which Sting admitted that Sheik had won, leading to a match between the two at Music City Showdown. On May 7 the two faced off, and Sheik was defeated by TV Champion Sting. In August 1989, he would form a brief alliance with Ron Simmons, appearing in his corner during a match with Jon Brewer. He would appear later that month in the corner of Simmons & The Cuban Assassin in a victory over Tommy Rich and Eddie Gilbert. On August 26, Simmons and Sheik were guests of Paul E. Dangerously's "Danger Zone", where he admitted that he was now training Simmons and was looking for a tag-team partner for him. The angle was eventually dropped and Simmons went on to team with Butch Reed as Doom, while Sheik finished his initial WCW tenure in house show matches against Norman in January 1990.

The Iron Sheik would return after a seven-month absence following Ole Anderson's elevation to head booker. A lapse in issuing a contract notice allowed Sheik's one-year deal to accidentally roll over and continue to work with the company. On July 7 at Great American Bash 1990 he faced Mike Rotunda in a losing effort in his first match back. He wrestled Brian Pillman, Tom Zenk, Terry Taylor, Brad Armstrong, and Big Van Vader on the house show circuit through the fall and winter of 1990. His final match was against the Junkyard Dog on January 26, 1991 in Columbia, South Carolina, after which he left the company.

Third return to the WWF (1991–1992) 
He returned to the WWF again on March 11, 1991, making his re-debut on Wrestling Challenge as Colonel Mustafa, and was aligned with former enemy Sgt. Slaughter. Along with Iraqi General Adnan, Slaughter and Mustafa were portrayed as Iraqi sympathizers during the Gulf War and feuded with Hulk Hogan and The Ultimate Warrior. Following Slaughter's face turn after SummerSlam 1991, Mustafa remained aligned with Adnan. He dropped to a lower midcard position, primarily losing matches against faces such as Slaughter, Tito Santana, British Bulldog, Ricky "The Dragon" Steamboat, "Texas Tornado" Kerry von Erich, "Hacksaw" Jim Duggan, and Tatanka. Mustafa would challenge for the WWF World Championship during the star-studded 1992 Royal Rumble match. Shortly thereafter, Adnan left the WWF and Mustafa would be without a manager for his final four months with the company, His final match was at a Superstars taping on May 19, 1992 where he defeated Reno Riggins, after which he left the promotion again.

Independent circuit (1992–2010) 
In 1992, the Sheik tried his hand at shoot style professional wrestling in the UWFi in Japan. He lost by tap-out to Yoji Anjo in about 5:30 (the in-ring action of the UWFi, though tailored to resemble an actual competitive bout, was in fact made up of predetermined outcomes). The Iron Sheik wrestled independently afterward and went on a wrestling tour to Nigeria in 1994, promoted by Chris Adams and co-sponsored by Pepsi, and featuring former WWF stars Jimmy Snuka, Greg Valentine, Demolition Ax, and World Class wrestler/owner Kevin Von Erich.

The Sheik was the second champion of "Boston Bad Boy" Tony Rumble's Century Wrestling Alliance, originally winning the title from Tommy Dreamer in Burlington, Vermont on March 21, and dropping the championship to Vic Steamboat on October 23, 1993 in Wakefield, Massachusetts. The Iron Sheik's final match took place at MWF Soul Survivor VI April 24, 2010 in Melrose, Massachusetts, teaming with TNA star "Black Machismo" Jay Lethal to defeat "Stalker" Dylan Kage (with Paul Bearer) by making Kage submit to the camel clutch. The Sheik remains active in the MWF as a manager.

Sporadic appearances in WWF/E (1996–present) 
In late 1996, the Sheik teamed with his old nemesis Bob Backlund to manage WWF wrestler The Sultan, who had a Middle Eastern gimmick. He would manage Sultan until December 1997. He also for a time during the summer of 1997 co-managed Tiger Ali Singh (with Ali's father, Tiger Jeet Singh). By year's end he had failed another drug test (he has referred to this as a "medicine test" in various interviews) and was released. On April 1, 2001, at WrestleMania X-Seven, The Iron Sheik won the Gimmick Battle Royal, a match between other popular or outlandish wrestlers from the 1980s and 1990s. Rather than being booed for winning, the villainous Sheik (who had gained something of a cult following among wrestling fans) was cheered as a fan favorite. He eliminated Hillbilly Jim to win the Battle Royal and was immediately attacked by former rival/partner Sgt. Slaughter who put him in his Cobra clutch.

In 2005 before WrestleMania 21 in Los Angeles, The Iron Sheik was inducted into the WWE Hall of Fame by his long-time rival and former partner, Sgt. Slaughter. On the June 11, 2007 episode of Raw, he, along with Jimmy Snuka, appeared in a taped segment showing their appreciation of WWE owner Vince McMahon. On the June 18 episode of Raw, he approached McMahon's executive assistant Jonathan Coachman about having his own interview show on Raw. Coach replied saying, "I like the idea and I will really take some time to consider it."

On August 13, he appeared on an episode of Raw held at Madison Square Garden for a WWE version of American Idol. Sheik came out with Nikolai Volkoff while Volkoff sang the Soviet anthem. The March 10, 2008 edition of Raw featured rematches from previous WrestleManias. Iron Sheik appeared with Nikolai Volkoff to face off against the U.S. Express in a rematch from the first WrestleMania. Before the bout could begin, they were interrupted by Jillian Hall, who came out to sing the Bruce Springsteen song "Born in the USA" which had been the U.S. Express' entrance music during their 1985 feud.

In 2004, his MWF Studio Shoot Interview DVD made him a star to a whole new generation of fans, talking about his hatred for Brian Blair, Hulk Hogan, Jake Roberts and others. On October 2, 2009, on the 10th anniversary of Smackdown, he appeared backstage arguing with Sgt. Slaughter, choking on a shrimp, then helped by Hurricane Helms. He made an appearance on Raw on November 16, 2009 in the opening of the show, with Rowdy Roddy Piper and Luis Guzmán, going nuts on Hulk Hogan and proving his dominance with a LJN WWF action figure of himself and Hulk Hogan. On the November 15, 2010, edition of Raw, as part of the Old School theme, Iron Sheik appeared with Nikolai Volkoff, singing the Soviet national anthem before being interrupted by Santino Marella and Vladimir Kozlov, the latter of whom then sung a duet with Volkoff of the Russian National anthem. He then proceeded to rant on Hulk Hogan until his microphone was cut off.

Other
In February 2011, The Iron Sheik underwent an ankle operation to repair his damaged left ankle, which is one of the many injuries he has sustained over his long professional and amateur wrestling career, an operation which lasted 9 hours. In an interview after the operation, Khosrow stated that, although he found a big improvement, he felt like he had another 50 percent to fully recover, and as of 2014, he is awaiting another ankle operation.

On November 6, 2013, Vaziri challenged the then Mayor of Toronto, Rob Ford, to an arm wrestling match at his office.

Starting in August 2009, Vaziri's major claim to fame is his Twitter account, featuring violent, profanity-ridden Tweets denouncing various celebrities, making him a comedy star on social media. He does not write the Tweets issued under his name, two Toronto-based special-event organizers, Jian and Page Magen, do.

Although Vaziri is Iranian, he often wears an Arab style Keffiyeh.

Acting career 
The Iron Sheik made his film debut in The Tale of the 3 Mohammads in 2005. He then appeared alongside Daniel Baldwin and Corey Feldman in Operation Belvis Bash in 2011. Sheik also made an appearance on the Canadian show Kenny vs. Spenny on the "Who is a better pro wrestler?" episode where he attempted to sodomize a naked Spenny with a beer bottle. He also appeared in Maz Jobrani's 2009 stand-up comedy special Brown & Friendly. The Sheik made an appearance as himself in Robot Chicken, as well as The Eric André Show on Cartoon Network's Adult Swim. In 2014, The Iron Sheik acted in a documentary about his life titled "The Sheik."

Personal life 
Vaziri is a Shia Muslim and a former soldier in the Imperial Iranian Army. He married Caryl J. Peterson on March 21, 1976; the best man at the wedding was "Mean" Gene Okerlund (whom the Sheik often referred to as "Gene Mean" in his broken English). They have two living daughters as well as five grandchildren together. His eldest daughter Marissa was murdered by her boyfriend Charles Warren Reynolds in May 2003 at the age of 26. Reynolds was taken into custody and later convicted of the crime. Reynolds himself died on May 31, 2016.

In August 2013, Iron Sheik's managers Page and Jian Magen crowdsourced $40,441 to write, direct and produce a documentary, Iranian Legend: The Iron Sheik Story. Originally, the documentary was scheduled for a 2008 release under the title Iron Sheik: From A to Z. Sheik's documentary was released in 2014 under the title The Sheik.

Championships and accomplishments 
 All-California Championship Wrestling
 ACCW Heavyweight Championship (2 times)
 Century Wrestling Alliance
 CWA Heavyweight Championship (1 time)
George Tragos/Lou Thesz Professional Wrestling Hall of Fame
Class of 2016
 Georgia Championship Wrestling
 NWA National Television Championship (1 time)
 International Association of Wrestling
 IAW Heavyweight Championship (1 time)
 IAW Tag Team Championship (3 times) – with Brian Costello
 International Wrestling Association
 IWA Intercontinental Championship (1 time)
 International Wrestling Association
 IWA United States Heavyweight Championship (1 time)
 Maple Leaf Wrestling
 NWA Canadian Heavyweight Championship (Toronto version) (2 times)
 Mid-Atlantic Championship Wrestling
 NWA Mid-Atlantic Heavyweight Championship (1 time)
 NWA All-Star Wrestling
 NWA Canadian Tag Team Championship (Vancouver version) (1 time) – with The Texas Outlaw
 NWA Canadian Tag Team Championship Tournament (1978) - with The Texas Outlaw
 National Wrestling Alliance
 NWA Hall of Fame (Class of 2008)
 NWA New Zealand
 NWA New Zealand British Commonwealth Championship (1 time)
 NWA 2000
 NWA 2000 American Heritage Championship (1 time)
 Pacific Northwest Wrestling
 NWA Pacific Northwest Tag Team Championship (1 time) – with Bull Ramos
 Pro Wrestling Illustrated
 PWI ranked him No. 134 of the 500 best singles wrestlers of the "PWI Years" in 2003
 PWI ranked him No. 96 of the 100 best tag teams of the "PWI Years" with the Nikolai Volkoff in 2003
 World Wrestling Federation/World Wrestling Entertainment
 WWF World Heavyweight Championship (1 time)
 WWF Tag Team Championship (1 time) – with Nikolai Volkoff
 WWE Hall of Fame (Class of 2005)
 Wrestling Observer Newsletter
 Most Underrated Wrestler (1980)

References

Further reading 
 Flair, Ric & Greenberg, Keith Elliot. Ric Flair: To Be the Man. New York: Pocket Books, 2004.
 Meltzer, Dave. The Wrestling Observer's Who's Who in Pro Wrestling. Turlock: Pro Wrestling Observer Newsletter, 1986.
 Greatest Wrestling Stars of the 1980s, WWE Home Video, 2005.
  S. Rahmani. "Wrestling with the Revolution: The Iron Sheik and the American Cultural Response to the 1979 Iranian Revolution" Iranian Studies 40.1 2007

External links 

 
 
 
 

1942 births
Bodyguards
Iranian emigrants to the United States
Iranian male sport wrestlers
Iranian military personnel
Iranian professional wrestlers
Iranian stand-up comedians
Living people
Olympic coaches
Professional wrestling managers and valets
Professional wrestling trainers
Sportspeople from Tehran
Sportspeople of Iranian descent
The First Family (professional wrestling) members
WWE Champions
WWE Hall of Fame inductees
20th-century professional wrestlers
NWA Canadian Heavyweight Champions
NWA National Television Champions